Sandomierz bridgehead, also known as Sandomierz-Baranów bridgehead was a pocket of resistance created by Red Army's 1st Ukrainian Front in late July 1944 on the left bank of the Vistula River in German-occupied Poland. Located around the towns of Sandomierz and Baranów, it covered roughly 40 by 70 kilometres.

The creation of the bridgehead was one of the final acts of the Lvov–Sandomierz offensive of the Red Army. In the evening of 29 July 1944 elements of the 350th Rifle Division under Major General Grigori Vekhin reached the Vistula River and crossed it near Baranów. The following day a large part of the 13th Army followed into the gap, along with 1st Guards Tank Army. By the end of the day the bridgehead was expanded to a strip of land 12 by 8 kilometres.

The Wehrmacht started a massive counter-attack on 1 August 1944 by a pincer movement from Mielec and Tarnobrzeg. After several days of heavy fighting, the Soviet 33rd Rifle Corps and 9th Mechanized Corps pushed the German forces back and threw them out of Tarnobrzeg by 6 August.

On 11 August the Germans started yet another counter-attack, this time from Szydłów intending to cut the Soviet units from the river. However, the German offensive came to a standstill after three days, and on 14 August the Soviets started a push from the direction of Klimontów and a small bridgehead near Zawichost towards the north. The Soviet attack reached Sandomierz, but was stopped soon afterwards. By the end of the month both sides dug, unable to mount further offensive movements, and went on defence. The front stabilised until 7 January 1945, when the Vistula–Oder offensive started.

References 

Strategic operations of the Red Army in World War II
Military operations of World War II involving Germany
Military history of Poland during World War II
Battles and operations of the Soviet–German War
Sandomierz